National Route 77 (N77) is a , two-to-four national primary road connecting Lanao del Norte and Lanao del Sur.

History
The route numbers are implemented around early 2017. The Lanao del Norte portion is maintained by DPWH while the Lanao del Sur portion is maintained by Bangsamoro regional government.

Route description

Iligan
N77 starts in Iligan as Misamis Oriental-Maria Cristina Boundary Road in a route change from N9.

Baloi to Saguiaran
After the end of the Iligan Section, it is called Iligan City-Marawi Road. After reaching Saguiaran, it is now maintained by the Bangsamoro Regional Government.

Marawi to Malabang
The road changes its name at parts of Lanao del Sur. It ends in Malabang at a half-y junction in AH26.

References

Roads in Mindanao